Veton Berisha (born 13 April 1994) is a Norwegian professional footballer who plays as a forward for Molde in Eliteserien. His parents are from Kosovo and he is the younger brother of Valon Berisha. Berisha has represented Norway at every level from under-15 to full international level.

Club career
Berisha was born in Egersund, and started his career in the local club Egersunds IK. He was considered one of the biggest Norwegian talents at his age and, like his brother Valon, Veton was on a trial with Manchester City before he signed for Viking in May 2009, but did not join the club until the summer of 2010. He made his debut for Egersunds' first-team in 2009 against Hundvåg, and in total he played 21 matches for the Third Division side.

After joining Viking, Berisha trained with the first team in the pre-season ahead of the 2011 season, and made his debut for the club when he replaced Erik Nevland after 60 minutes in the First Round of the 2011 Norwegian Cup against his old club Egersund. Berisha got his first minutes of playing-time in Tippeligaen in the 1–3 loss against Tromsø on 19 May 2011, and started his first match for Viking when Brann was beaten 3–0 on 17 June 2011.

On 19 June 2011, Berisha and his brother Valon became the first brothers to start a match for Viking in 22 years since Jan and Egil Fjetland played against Molde in the 1989 Norwegian Cup final. After the match, Viking's manager Åge Hareide said that "It's fun to start the game with two brothers, I only wish they could pass the ball to others than themselves, as it would create a lot more chances for us, but since they are brothers I guess we can forgive them. In the match against Aalesund on 17 July 2011, Berisha got his first league-goal when he scored the match-winning goal 12 minutes after he came on as a substitute to replace Erik Nevland.

During the mid-summer break in the 2012 season, Berisha expressed a concern about his lack of playing time; he had only played 69 minutes in the league that season and his last appearance in Viking's starting line-up was on 7 August 2011. But Berisha was hoping for a fresh start after Kjell Jonevret was hired as the new head coach following Hareide's departure. In the Fourth Round of the 2012 Norwegian Cup, Berisha scored Viking's first goal after only one minute on the pitch, but Brann eventually won 3–2.

On 15 July 2012, Berisha secured Jonevret his first victory as Viking-coach, when he scored the match-winning goal in the stoppage-time against Hønefoss.

On 22 April 2013, it was reported that Berisha fractured his right elbow and would be absent for two months.

After scoring 11 goals in 14 matches halfway through the 2015 season, Berisha joined 2. Bundesliga side Greuther Fürth on a free transfer on 1 July 2015. On 1 September 2017, he signed a three-year contract with Austrian club Rapid Wien.

On 30 March 2019, he returned to Norwegian football, signing a four-year contract with Brann. In January 2020, Berisha joined his former club Viking for a reported fee of around NOK 6.5 million. He signed a four-year contract with the club.

On 23 July 2022, Berisha transferred to Hammarby IF in the Swedish Allsvenskan, signing a four and a half-year deal. The transfer fee was reportedly set at around 20 million Norwegian kroner, making it a record breaking transfer for Hammarby. In total, Berisha made 15 competitive appearances for Hammarby, scoring four goals, helping the side to reach a 3rd place in the 2022 Allsvenskan table.

On 24 January 2023, Molde announced the signing of Berisha to a four-year contract. He was sought out as a replacement for David Datro Fofana and the transfer fee was reportedly set at around 35-40 million Swedish kronor, with potential bonuses included.

International career
Berisha played one match for Norway U15 in 2009, and the next year he played nine matches for Norway U16 where he scored three goals. In 2011, he again scored three goals in nine matches while representing his country, this time for the under-17 team. Berisha made 14 appearances and scored eight goals for Norway U18. He represented the under-19 team twice in 2013, scoring one goal. Between 2013 and 2016, he played 17 matches and scored two goals for the under-21 team.

On 29 May 2016, he made his debut for the senior national team of Norway in a match against Portugal. He scored his first goal for Norway on 5 June 2016 against Belgium.

Like his brother Valon, he was approached by Kosovo when they became FIFA members in May 2016. However, unlike his brother who elected to represent Kosovo, he decided to keep representing Norway.

Career statistics

Club

International

Scores and results list Norway's goal tally first, score column indicates score after each Berisha goal.

References

1994 births
Living people
People from Egersund
Kosovo Albanians
Norwegian people of Kosovan descent
Norwegian people of Albanian descent
Norwegian footballers
Kosovan footballers
Association football forwards
Norway international footballers
Norway youth international footballers
Norway under-21 international footballers
Eliteserien players
Allsvenskan players
2. Bundesliga players
Egersunds IK players
Viking FK players
SpVgg Greuther Fürth players
SK Rapid Wien players
SK Brann players
Hammarby Fotboll players
Norwegian expatriate footballers
Kosovan expatriate footballers
Expatriate footballers in Austria
Norwegian expatriate sportspeople in Austria
Kosovan expatriate sportspeople in Austria
Expatriate footballers in Germany
Norwegian expatriate sportspeople in Germany
Kosovan expatriate sportspeople in Germany
Norwegian expatriate sportspeople in Sweden
Kosovan expatriate sportspeople in Sweden
Expatriate footballers in Sweden
Sportspeople from Rogaland